The 2022–23 Navy Midshipmen men's basketball team represented the United States Naval Academy in the 2022–23 NCAA Division I men's basketball season. The Midshipmen, led by 12th-year head coach Ed DeChellis, played their home games at Alumni Hall in Annapolis, Maryland as members of the Patriot League.

Previous season
The Midshipmen finished the 2021–22 season 21–11, 12–6 in Patriot League play to finish in second place. In the Patriot League tournament, they defeated American and Boston University, before falling to Colgate in the championship game.

Roster

Schedule and results

|-
!colspan=12 style=""| Non-conference regular season

|-
!colspan=12 style=""| Patriot League regular season

|-
!colspan=9 style=| Patriot League tournament

|-

Sources

References

Navy Midshipmen men's basketball seasons
Navy Midshipmen
Navy Midshipmen men's basketball
Navy Midshipmen men's basketball